Camden Township is a township in DeKalb County, in the U.S. state of Missouri. Camden Township was established in 1845, and named after Camden, South Carolina.

References

Townships in Missouri
Townships in DeKalb County, Missouri